Kleine Scheidegg is a 1937 Swiss drama film directed by Richard Schweizer and starring Susanne Baader, Leopold Biberti and Emil Hegetschweiler. It is set around the Kleine Scheidegg Pass in Switzerland. It is part of the genre of mountain films, popular in the 1930s.

Cast
 Susanne Baader - Ulla Matthei 
 Leopold Biberti - Dr. Matthei 
 Emil Hegetschweiler - Concierge 
 Armin Schweizer - Das Hotelfaktotum 
 Hans Brügger - Der Bergführer 
 Simon Brocader - Tourist

Bibliography
 Clarke, David B. & Doel, Marcus A. Moving Pictures/Stopping Places: Hotels and Motels on Film. Lexington Books, 2009.
 Wider, Werner & Aeppli, Felix. Der Schweizer Film 1929-1964. Limmat, 1981.

External links

1937 films
Swiss drama films
Swiss German-language films
Films set in Switzerland
Films set in the Alps
Mountaineering films
1937 drama films
Swiss black-and-white films